Nadroparin (trade names Fraxiparin[e], Fraxodi, among others) is an anticoagulant belonging to a class of drugs called low molecular weight heparins (LMWHs). Nadroparin was developed by Sanofi-Synthélabo.

Nadroparin is used in general and orthopedic surgery to prevent thromboembolic disorders (deep vein thrombosis and pulmonary embolism), and as treatment for deep vein thrombosis. It is also used to prevent clotting during hemodialysis, and for treatment of unstable angina and non-Q wave myocardial infarction.

For the treatment and prevention of DVT, the drug is administered as a subcutaneous injection (under the skin), usually around the abdomen. It is on the World Health Organization's List of Essential Medicines.

References

External links
 
 

Heparins